18p may refer to:

 A sub-section of Chromosome 18 (human)
 Monosomy 18p
 Tetrasomy 18p

See also
 P18 (disambiguation)